is a passenger railway station located in the city of Higashikagawa, Kagawa Prefecture, Japan. It is operated by JR Shikoku and has the station number "T09".

Lines
Sanuki-Aioi Station is served by the JR Shikoku Kōtoku Line and is located 47.6 km from the beginning of the line at Takamatsu. Only local services stop at the station.

Layout
The station consists of two opposed side platforms serving two tracks. The station building is unstaffed and serves only as a waiting room. Access to the opposite platform is by means of a footbridge. It is also possible to access platform 2 from a road running behind it by means of a short flight of steps.

History
At that time the station was operated by Japanese Government Railways, later becoming Japanese National Railways (JNR). With the privatization of JNR on 1 April 1987, control of the station passed to JR Shikoku.

Surrounding area
Sakamoto Beach
Osaka Pass

See also
List of railway stations in Japan

References

External links

Station timetable

Railway stations in Kagawa Prefecture
Railway stations in Japan opened in 1935
Higashikagawa, Kagawa